Robert M. "Bob" Merrick  (born January 18, 1971) is an American competitive sailor and Olympic silver medalist.

He won a silver medal in the 470 class at the 2000 Summer Olympics in Sydney, along with his partner Paul Foerster. Merrick was born in New York City, New York.

References

1971 births
Living people
Sportspeople from New York City
American male sailors (sport)
Sailors at the 2000 Summer Olympics – 470
Olympic silver medalists for the United States in sailing
Medalists at the 2000 Summer Olympics